The 2019 WAFF U-15 Girls Championship is the 2nd edition of the WAFF U-15 Girls Championship, an international women's football youth tournament organised by the West Asian Football Federation (WAFF). It was held in Jordan from 12 to 16 December 2019. Lebanon won their first title undefeated.

Teams
Four teams entered the WAFF U-15 Girls Championship final tournament.

Championship table

Champion

Player awards
The following awards were given at the conclusion of the tournament:

Goalscorers

References

External links

U15 2019
WAFF U15
WAFF U15